Rapscallion  may refer to:

 Rapscallion, space freighter in The Space Gypsy Adventures
 The Rapscallions, antagonist army in the book The Long Patrol
 The Rapscallions, a collegiate a cappella group from the 1980s
 Rapp Scallion, a character in the game Monkey Island
 "The Last Superpower AKA Rapscallion", a song by Primus, from their 2003 EP Animals Should Not Try to Act Like People
 RapScallions, an American rock band
 Rapsgaliwn, a Welsh language children's TV show.